Boris Belyakov (born 1927, date of death unknown) was a Soviet Olympic fencer. He competed in the individual and team sabre events at the 1952 Summer Olympics.

References

1927 births
Year of death missing
Soviet male fencers
Olympic fencers of the Soviet Union
Fencers at the 1952 Summer Olympics